Friedrich Johannes Paul Högner (11 July 1897 − 26 March 1981) was a German organist and church musician.

Career 

At the same time he was musical director at the St. Thomas School, Leipzig and in 1924 he took over the representation of Karl Straube at the conservatory .

In 1925, Högner went to Regensburg as city cantor and Kirchenmusikdirektor. in Roma Quanta fuit. Wißner Augsburg, 2010, ]. In 1929 he returned to the Leipzig Conservatory as an organ teacher. There he was organist at the Paulinerkirche and was appointed professor at the Church Music Institute in 1934. From 1937 to 1965 he was the regional church music director of the Evangelical Lutheran Church in Bavaria. From 1959 he was also professor at the Staatliche Hochschule für Musik in Munich and head of the department for church music.

Bell expert 
 His name is mentioned on the homepage of the Kaiser Wilhelm Memorial Church in the context of his work as a bell expert: "...The board of trustees of the foundation Kaiser-Wilhelm-Gedächtniskirche decided in its meeting on July 8, 1959, to use the tone sequence Gº Bº C' D' D` Es' F', which had been proposed independently by several experts. Wolfgang Reimann and Friedrich Högner had also pleaded for this tone sequence, which best met the different requirements...".

Jury member 

Trivia 
Högner had no driver's license. So he travelled around by train or had relatives take him to his destination. If, for example, as a bell expert he had his bell testing instruments with him, he had to carry the heavy bag with him.

Högner died in Munich at the age of 83.

Honours 
 1955: Order of Merit of the Federal Republic of Germany
 Bavarian Order of Merit.

Literature 
 Friedrich Herzfeld (ed.): Das Neue Ullstein Lexikon der Musik. Ullstein, Frankfurt [et al.] 1993.
 Bernhard A. Kohl in Das Große Lexikon der Musik. Volume 4, . Freiburg in Br. 1981 [et al.]

References

External links 

 
 Högner, Friedrich Johannes Paul on BMLO
 Hofmann, Friedrich: Friedrich Högner 1897–1981. In Gottesdienst und Kirchenmusik 1981, .
 

German classical organists
Academic staff of the University of Music and Theatre Leipzig
Academic staff of the University of Music and Performing Arts Munich
Officers Crosses of the Order of Merit of the Federal Republic of Germany
1897 births
1981 deaths
Musicians from Bavaria
20th-century classical musicians